Jean Bastia (21 February 1919 in Bastia, Corsica - 16 February 2005), was a French film director, screenwriter and film producer.

Filmography

Director 
 Nous autres à Champignol (1957)
 Les Aventuriers du Mékong (1958)
 Le Gendarme de Champignol (1959)
 Certains l'aiment froide (1960)
 Les Tortillards (1960)
 Dynamite Jack (1961)
  (1966)
 ...Et mourir de désir (1974)
 Réseau secret (1976)

Writer 
 Nous autres à Champignol (1957)
 Les Tortillards (1960)
 Dynamite Jack (1961)
  (1966)
 Réseau secret (1967)

Producer 
 Moi, fleur bleue (1977)
 Ça va pas la tête (1978)
 Salut ... J'arrive (1982)
 Clash (1984)

References

External links

1919 births
French film directors
French male screenwriters
20th-century French screenwriters
French film producers
2005 deaths
People from Bastia
20th-century French male writers